Doutor Coffee (株式会社ドトールコーヒー) is a Japanese retail company that specializes in coffee roasting and coffee shop franchising. It was founded by Toriba Hiromichi.

Information
The company currently has over 900 locations in Japan, has begun expansion in Taiwan and most recently in Malaysia and Singapore. It is listed on the Tokyo Stock Exchange. Doutor Coffee has over 1,200 outlets altogether.

History
Doutor Coffee opened the first European styled café in Harajuku, Japan on 18 April 1980. The size of the small shop was only nine square meters. Despite the small size and local competition, the Doutor Coffee shop succeeded and has expanded to the company that it is now.

Doutor Coffee opened its own coffee plantation in 1991, in Kona District, Hawaii. It opened a second plantation in 1995.

Roasting coffee
Roasting coffee using hot air is a commonly used method by most roasting plants, but Doutor says it "takes away the original flavor of the coffee" and explored other ways to roast the coffee. They found open flame roasting their preferred method and ended up embarking on researching and developing its own industrial open flame roaster to roast its coffee.

See also

 List of coffeehouse chains

References

Coffeehouses and cafés in Japan
Retail companies based in Tokyo
Restaurants established in 1976
Japanese brands
Coffee companies of Japan
Coffee brands
1976 establishments in Japan
Companies listed on the Tokyo Stock Exchange